The Ostrołęka Power Station is a coal-fired thermal power station in Ostrołęka, Poland.  It is owned by Energa SA.

The power station consists of two parts. The  Ostrołęka A combined heat and power plant with installed capacity of 93 MW electricity and 456 MW heat was built in 1956.  The Ostrołęka B power station was built in 1972. It consists of three units with combined installed capacity of 647 MW.

There were plans to build an additional unit of 1,000 MW capacity called Ostrołęka C by 2015, with coal supplied by the Bogdanka Coal Mine. The project struggled with financing and delays, and low electricity and natural gas prices made it seem ever more uneconomical. Early 2020, the special purpose vehicle created for the project, Elektrownia Ostrołęka, announced a 90-days hiatus on the building activity to research the possibility to switch the fuel source to natural gas. In May 2020 the indefinite suspension of the partly constructed project was announced, with participating partners writing down PLN1 billion (around $250 million) of investments on the now stranded asset.

History 

 1917 - Electrification of the city of Ostrołęka in connection with the development of the sawmill industry
 1928 - Completion of the diesel power plant at Mazowiecka street
 1929 - Extension of the power plant - 300 hp engine and 250 kW generator
 1930-1933 - Construction of a small hydro power plant on the Omulew River in Grabów
 1953 - The start of the construction of a heat and power plant planned for the operation of the pulp and paper industry
 21 July 1956 - The first OP-100 boiler and a 14 MW turbine set were put into operation
 1956-1958 - Extension of the heat and power plant with further boilers and turbine sets
 1967 - Extension of the heat and power plant with the OPP-230 boiler and the 34.1 MW turbine set
 1968 - The start of the construction of a thermal power station with a target capacity of 600 MW
 1 January 1972 - Power plants were merged into Elektrownia Ostrołęka Complex
 20 December 1972 - Opening of Ostrołęka B power plant
 1 January 1989 - Creation of state enterprise - Zespół Elektrowni Ostrołęka
 1997 - A biomass-fired fluidized bed combustor (bark and wood chips) converted from an OP-100 coal boiler started its work
 31 August 1998 - Zespół Elektrowni Ostrołęka S.A. were registered
 2000-2003 - Modernization of units 1 and 3 in the Ostrołęka B power plant
 2007 - Commissioning of a new chimney with a flue gas desulfurization system.
 10 December 2008 - The name changed

The name Zespół Elektrowni Ostrołęka SA was replaced by the new name: ENERGA Elektrownie Ostrołęka Spółka Akcyjna.

References

See also
 List of power stations in Poland

Energy infrastructure completed in 1956
Energy infrastructure completed in 1972
Coal-fired power stations in Poland
Cogeneration power stations in Poland
Buildings and structures in Ostrołęka